Church of the Protection of the Theotokos is a Russian Orthodox church in Zheleznodorozhny City District of Novosibirsk, Russia. It was built in 1901

History
Church of the Protection of the Theotokos was consecrated on December 10, 1901 by Protoiereus Fyodor Sosunov.

The church was expanded in 1906, the refectory and the bell tower were attached to it.

In 1915, the parish had more than 2000 parishioners.

In the early 1930s, the church was closed and then occupied by various organizations (theater school, Siberian Folk Choir etc.).

In 1994, it was transferred to the Novosibirsk Diocese.

From 2002 to 2007, it was reconstructed.

Gallery

References

Churches in Siberia
Churches in Novosibirsk
Zheleznodorozhny City District, Novosibirsk
Wooden churches in Russia
Churches completed in 1901
Cultural heritage monuments of regional significance in Novosibirsk Oblast
Russian Orthodox church buildings in Russia